Robert Langton Douglas (1864–1951) was a British art critic, lecturer, and author, and director of the National Gallery of Ireland.

Biography
Douglas was born in Davenham, Cheshire, and educated at New College, Oxford. He was for years a University Extension lecturer, and for a time was in holy orders in the Church of England. From 1895 to 1900 he resided in Italy. While a chaplain there, he wrote a monograph on Fra Angelico in consultation with various scholars, including Bernard Berenson. He relinquished his church appointment in 1900 to become professor of Modern History at the University of Adelaide, Australia, then returned to Italy in 1901 where he wrote A History of Siena.

He lectured on art at the Royal Institution and the Society of Arts, was made dean of the faculty of arts in 1901, and contributed to many magazines and reviews. At age 50, in 1914, Douglas enlisted in the British Army for World War I, and rose from private to staff captain and a position with the War Office in London. Douglas was awarded for his bravery in World War I. In 1916 Douglas was appointed director of the National Gallery of Ireland in Dublin, but resigned in 1923 after a disagreement with its trustees. He settled in New York City in 1940, writing text for the Duveen art galleries.  

Known chiefly as an authority on Sienese art, his most important publications are an edition of Crowe and Cavalcaselle's History of Painting in Italy (1903, et. seq.), and:  
 Fra Angelico (second edition, 1902)  
 History of Siena (1902)  
 La Maioliche di Siena (1904)  
 Illustrated Catalogue of Pictures of Siena and Objects of Art (Burlington Fine Arts Club, 1904)  

Douglas was the father of Marshal of the Royal Air Force Sholto Douglas, 1st Baron Douglas of Kirtleside and Professor Terence Wilmot Hutchison (world-renowned expert on the history of economic thought).  Douglas's daughter Clare (the half-sister of Sholto Douglas) was the second wife of writer J.D. Salinger.  Douglas's son Gavin was Head of Conservation at Marlborough Gallery's.

References 
 "Robert L. Douglas, British Art Expert," New York Times obituary, 16 August 1951, p. 24.
 

1864 births
1951 deaths
Military personnel from Cheshire
People from Lavenham
British Army personnel of World War I
Royal Army Service Corps soldiers
Royal Army Service Corps officers
English art historians
Alumni of New College, Oxford
Museum people from Dublin (city)